The Jet Set is a Polish R&B duo which consists of English-born David Junior Serame (South African ancestry) and Russian-born Sasha Strunin. They represented Poland in the semi-final of the Eurovision Song Contest 2007 in Helsinki.

Eurovision Song Contest 2007
The Jet Set represented Poland in the Eurovision Song Contest 2007 after winning the national selection on February 3. They performed the song "Time to Party" in the semi-final of the competition on May 10 in Helsinki, Finland, finishing 14th of 28 entrants and failing to qualify for the final.

Promo tour "Time to Party":
17.02.2007 Spain (Misión Eurovisión 2007)
23.02.2007 Cyprus (Cyprus 12 point)
24.02.2007 Latvia
03.03.2007 Lithuania
09.03.2007 Ukraine
30.03.2007 Ireland (The Late Late Show)

Discography

Albums

Singles
"How Many People" (2006)
"Just Call Me" (2006) - POL #9
"Time to Party" (2007) - TUR #85
"The Time of Our Life" (2008)

External links 
 Video of song "Time to party"
 The Jet Set Blog in Polish
 The Jet Set - another website in Polish
 http://www.esctoday.com/news/read/7505
 "How many people" Preselection 2006
 The best unofficial site about Sasha Strunin

Eurovision Song Contest entrants for Poland
Eurovision Song Contest entrants of 2007
Polish musical groups